Ragettli is a surname. Notable people with the surname include: 

Andri Ragettli (born 1998), Swiss skier
Nina Ragettli (born 1993), Swiss skier